is a Japanese animation studio based in Musashino, Tokyo that specializes in the production of 3DCG animation. The studio is known for its exaggerated 3D and directing style, which differs from the traditional movement often found in CG works.

Establishment
Eiji Inomoto, a CG animator who had become somewhat well known for his work on Zoids: Chaotic Century and Ghost in the Shell: Stand Alone Complex (as one of the main Tachikoma 3D Unit members), founded Orange on May 1, 2004. For a majority of the studio's early history, the company mainly did outsourced 3D work for other studio's productions, like the original anime Heroic Age in 2007 (for Xebec) and the adaptation of Rail Wars! (for Passione) in 2014. It wasn't until 2013, 9 years after its founding, that Orange was involved a major project's production on a significant level: their co-production of Majestic Prince with studio Doga Kobo. Following Majestic Prince, the company began co-producing a number of works, like Black Bullet with Kinema Citrus, and in 2017, the studio produced its first anime not under a co-production. This was an adaptation of Land of the Lustrous, which was met with positive critical reception, with praise being given for its usage of CG animation.

Works
The list below is a list of Orange's works as a lead animation studio.

Anime television series

OVAs, ONAs, and television specials

Films

References

External links
Orange Official Website 

 
Animation studios in Tokyo
Mass media companies established in 2004
Japanese animation studios
Japanese companies established in 2004
Musashino, Tokyo